Rebonds is a composition for solo percussion by Greek composer Iannis Xenakis. It was composed between 1987 and 1989 and, together with Psappha, is one of the two compositions for solo percussion by Xenakis.

Composition 

Rebonds was written for percussionist , for whom Xenakis had also dedicated other chamber compositions, such as Komboï. It was later published by Éditions Salabert, in an edition revised by Patrick Butin.

Many different elements of this piece, such as the ideas of indeterminancy, and the fact that the piece sounds as if more than one person is playing, creates a new sound for solo percussionists.

Structure 

The composition is in two autonomous movements, named A and B. The first movement uses only skins, with two bongos, three tom-toms, and two bass drums. The second movement, however, uses two bongos, one tumba, one tom-tom, one bass drum, and a set of five wood blocks or wooden slats. According to Xenakis, the order of the composition is not fixed: either first A, then B, or vice versa, but both movements should be performed attacca.

Reception 

Rebonds has been very well received by critics and musicians. Jacques Longchamp called it an "immense abstract ritual, a suite of movements and of hammerings without any folkloristic "contamination", pure music full of marvellously efflorescent rhythms, going beyond drama and tempest. A new masterpiece".

Notable recordings 

The following is a list of notable performances of this composition:

References 

Compositions by Iannis Xenakis
1989 compositions
Percussion music